Hridaypur railway station is a Kolkata Suburban Railway station in Hridaypur. It serves the Barasat's areas of Dakbunglow, Rathtala, Purbachal, Shishirkunja, Udayrajpur and Chandigarh in the North 24 Parganas district, West Bengal, India. It is under the jurisdiction of Eastern Railway.

History
In 1882–84 the Bengal Central Railway Company constructed two lines: one from Dum Dum to Khulna, now in Bangladesh, via Bangaon and the other linking Ranaghat and Bangaon. The Hridaypur railway station lies in the Dum Dum–Bangaon section and was opened in 1906.

Hridaypur Station has an interesting history. Initially it was just one platform (1) only. Then the second one (2) was built, followed by two passengers shades on both sides. There were however no connecting over-bridge across these two platforms. It took few years for that to come up.

In early days, the station had a small adjoining "bazaar" next to the Platform 1. With time, this has now turned into a dense market where one may find everything from fish to fry pan!

Electrification
The Sealdah–Hasnabad–Bangaon–Ranaghat line was electrified in the year 1972.

Station complex 
The structure of the station is not so large. There are four entrances, two in each platform. The computerised ticket counter is present in platform no. 1. All the Sealdah and Dum Dum-bound trains arrive at platform no.1 and all the Bangaon, Gobardanga, Thakurnagar, Habra, Duttapukur, Basirhat and Hasnabad bound trains arrive at platform no. 2. A few Hasnabad bound trains are galloping. A foot overbridge connects the two platforms. A level crossing exists at the southernmost end of the railway station.

Station layout

Metro rail connection

Extension plan from Noapara to Barasat

The proposed Metro railway extension (Line 4) alignment pass through Dum Dum Cantonment and Jessore Road up to Biman Bandar station. From there, the line would run under Jessore Road until New Barrackpore before reaching the surface at Madhyamgram station. From Madhyamgram to Barasat, the alignment would be elevated. However, for crossing the existing Road Over Bridge at Madhyamgram and Barasat, the alignment would descend gradually to ground level and rise again on viaduct. This is supposed to be beneficial for the people of North 24 Parganas district and will bring them closer to Kolkata's Business district. This would reduce the heavy pressure on Sealdah–Barasat section of Eastern Railways. The Madhyamgram Metro railway station is to be constructed in the Madhyamgram-Barasat section.

Work for the Noapara–Barasat (via NSC Bose Airport) metro extension has come to a halt as construction giant L&T has pulled out of the 20 km metro corridor project. L&T was unable to get on with the work due to the encroachment on railway land. L&T has moved out all major equipment from the project site at Barasat and has closed down two of the three site offices. The lone site office is locked.

Gallery

See also

References

External links
Hridaypur railway station map
 

Sealdah railway division
Railway stations in North 24 Parganas district
Railway stations opened in 1906
Kolkata Suburban Railway stations
1906 establishments in India